Ibukunoluwa Abiodun Awosika (born Bilkisu Abiodun Motunrayo Omobolanle Adekola on December 24, 1962) is a Nigerian business woman, motivational speaker, and an author. She was former Chairman of First Bank of Nigeria. She was appointed a member of Binance Global Advisory Board in September 2022.

Early life and education
Born as the third child of seven children in Ibadan, the capital of Oyo State, Ibukun completed her primary and secondary school education at St. Paul's African Church Primary School, Lagos and Methodist Girls' High School, Yaba respectively before she proceeded to the University of Ife (now Obafemi Awolowo University) where she graduated with a BSc in Chemistry although she had initially wanted to study Architecture and also ended up taking elective courses in Accounting. She holds post graduate and MBA certificates upon the completion of several business programmes at the Lagos Business School and IESE Business School – University of Navarra.

Career
While on her compulsory one-year National Youth Service Corps service (NYSC) in Kano State, Ibukun Awosika worked as an audit trainee at Akintola Williams & Co. which later became Deloitte, but returned home after the service and joined Alibert Nigeria Ltd., a furniture company, as showroom manager. In her quest to be independent, she established a furniture manufacturing company called Quebees Limited in 1989 before it evolved into The Chair Centre Limited and later SOKOA Chair Centre Limited following a venture merge with SOKOA S.A and Guaranty Trust Bank in 2004.

A fellow of the African Leadership Initiative and Aspen Global Leadership Network, Ibukun Awosika is a member of the
Nigerian Economic Summit Group, member of the board of Nigerian Sovereign Wealth Fund and former Chairperson, Board of Trustees of Women in Management, Business and Public Service. In 2011, she co-founded the Afterschool Graduate Development Centre, a career centre established to checkmate the high rate of unemployment in Nigeria.

On September 7, 2015, Ibukun became the first woman to be appointed Chairman of First Bank of Nigeria following the resignation of Prince Ajibola Afonja.

Ibukun Awosika is member of IESE's International Advisory Board (IAB). She also sits on the board of Digital Jewel Limited and Cadbury Nig Plc.

Media personality

Television
In 2008, Ibukun Awosika was among five Nigerian entrepreneurs who appeared in the first African version of the Dragon's Den. She also hosts a T.V programme called Business His Way. She also starred in the 2020 Citation alongsideTemi Otedola produced by Kunle Afolayan.

Books
The "Girl" Entrepreneurs
Business His Way
The 'Girl' Entrepreneurs: Our Stories So Far Kindle Edition

Awards and recognition

Personal life
Ibukun Awosika is married to Abiodun Awosika with whom she has three children.

See also 

Folorunso Alakija
Grace Alele-Williams
Omobola Johnson

References

External links

https://twitter.com/IbukunAwosika?ref_src=twsrc%5Egoogle%7Ctwcamp%5Eserp%7Ctwgr%5Eauthor

1962 births
Living people
Nigerian bankers
Businesspeople from Ibadan
Nigerian women writers
Obafemi Awolowo University alumni
Nigerian television personalities
Nigerian motivational speakers
20th-century Nigerian businesswomen
20th-century Nigerian businesspeople
Lagos Business School alumni
21st-century Nigerian businesswomen
21st-century Nigerian businesspeople
Methodist Girls' High School alumni
Nigerian self-help writers
Nigerian manufacturing businesspeople
Nigerian business writers
Women business writers
Nigerian chairpersons of corporations
Women corporate directors
University of Navarra alumni
Nigerian chief executives